Peter Knust (born 14 September 1960) is a retired German swimmer who won four medals in freestyle relays at the European and world championships in 1977, 1978 and 1981.

References

1960 births
Living people
German male swimmers
German male freestyle swimmers
World Aquatics Championships medalists in swimming
European Aquatics Championships medalists in swimming
People from Salzgitter
Sportspeople from Lower Saxony